Matt Carmichael may refer to:
Matt Carmichael (journalist), Australian sports journalist
Matt Carmichael (footballer) (born 1964), former English footballer
Matt Carmichael (jazz musician), Scottish jazz tenor saxophonist